HNB may refer to:

 Croatian National Bank
 Hasnabad railway station, in India
 Hatton National Bank, a Sri Lankan bank
 Heat-not-burn tobacco product, cigarette that heats tobacco to a lower temperature than when a conventional cigarette is burned
 Herne Bay railway station, in England
 Hexanitrobenzene, an explosive compound
 Hockey New Brunswick
 Home Node B, in wireless telecommunications
 Huntingburg Airport, in Indiana, United States
 HNB (band), a South Korean boy band

See also 
 H&B (disambiguation)